Lahuachaca is a small town in Bolivia, in Aroma Province. It lies 123 km from La Paz, on the Bolivian Altiplano, with the Cordillera Occidental to the west and the Cordillera Central to the east.

Climate
The average temperature in Lahuachaca is 9 °C. The average temperature varies from 7° in July to 11° in December. The average annual rainfall is 600 mm. The average monthly rainfall varies from 10 mm in June and July to 100 mm in December through until February.

Population
Population estimates for recent years include:
1992 - 2562 inhabitants
2001 - 2986 inhabitants
2012 - 5874 inhabitants

References

INE-Civic data 2001
Data from Aroma Province

Populated places in La Paz Department (Bolivia)